AVN-211 (CD-008-0173) is a drug which acts as a highly selective 5-HT6 receptor antagonist and is under development by Avineuro Pharmaceuticals for the treatment of schizophrenia. In early 2011, it successfully completed phase IIa clinical trials, with benefits on positive symptoms and some procognitive effects observed, and in mid 2013, phase IIb clinical trials for schizophrenia began. Avineuro Pharmaceuticals also expressed intention to start clinical trials of AVN-211 for Alzheimer's disease in 2015.

See also
 List of investigational antipsychotics
 AVN-101

References

External links
 Pipeline - Avineuro Pharmaceuticals, Inc.

5-HT6 antagonists
Antipsychotics
Experimental drugs